Shankar may refer to:

People
Shankar (name), including a list of people with the name
 Sankar (writer) (Mani Shankar Mukherjee), Bengali writer
L. Shankar, Indian violinist
S. Shankar, Indian film director commonly credited as Shankar
Sankar (writer & director), Indian film director, screenwriter, short story writer, and Novelist from Kerala.
Shankar (actor) (Shankar Panicker, born 1960), Indian film actor and director popularly known as Shankar
Shankar–Ehsaan–Loy, an Indian musical trio which composes music for film soundtracks

Fictional
 Shankar Roy Chowdhury, protagonist of the Chander Pahar franchise

Places 
Shankar, Jalandhar, a village located in Jallandhar, Punjab, India
Shankar, Iran, a village in Sistan and Baluchestan Province, Iran

See also 
Shankar's Virus, a computer virus that infects Word documents
Shankar's International Dolls Museum, New Delhi
Shankar's Weekly, a magazine founded by K. Shankar Pillai
Shankar Party unofficial name given to the Adhyatmik Ishwariya Vishwa Vidyalaya
 Sankar (disambiguation)
 Shankara (disambiguation)
 Sankara (disambiguation)